Adelbert Cavour Chapman (October 25, 1860 – September 1, 1943) was a former mayor of Moncton, New Brunswick, in 1896, 1920 and 1921. He was born and raised in Dorchester, and studied at Mount Allison University.

Early life
He was the son of Robert A. and Mary Elizabeth (Frost) Chapman.
He married P. Althea Cleveland on Oct. 24, 1883; and they have two sons and two daughters.

Career
Prior to being elected Mayor, Chapman served the city as an Alderman on Moncton City Council. He was owner of the New Brunswick Anchor Wire Fence Company, president of the Kent Lumber Company and National Dry Cleaning, Ltd (1919), a founding Director of the Central Trust Company Limited and one of the incorporaters of the Petitcodiac Hydro Development Company. He was also a president of the Moncton Hospital Board of Trustees.

Residence
His residence 169, Botsford Street was declared as a Historic Place in 2006.

Notes

References

External links
 MacKay Family & Connections in the Maritimes

 Atlantic Canada Genealogy Project 

Mount Allison University alumni
Mayors of Moncton
1860 births
1943 deaths